Colette Giudicelli (24 November 1943 – 24 September 2020) was a French politician and a member of the French Senate. She represented the Alpes-Maritimes department and was a member of the Union for a Popular Movement party and later of The Republicans.

She began her political career as city councillor of Menton in 1989. Giudicelli was married to Jean-Claude Guibal, mayor of Menton.

Colette Giudicelli died on 24 September 2020 at the age of 76.

References

External links
Alphabetical list of current Senators (2011)

1943 births
2020 deaths
French city councillors
French Senators of the Fifth Republic
Union for a Popular Movement politicians
The Republicans (France) politicians
Senators of Alpes-Maritimes
Women members of the Senate (France)
21st-century French women politicians
20th-century French women politicians
French people of Italian descent
Chevaliers of the Légion d'honneur
People from Algiers
French general councillors